Mpho Mabogo (born 28 July 1980) is a Botswana footballer. He currently plays for Centre Chiefs in the Mascom Premier League.

External links

1980 births
Living people
Botswana footballers
Mochudi Centre Chiefs SC players
Botswana international footballers
Botswana Defence Force XI F.C. players
Association football forwards